The term recreational vehicle (RV) is often used as a broad category of motor vehicles and trailers which include living quarters for designed temporary accommodation. Types of RVs include motorhomes, campervans, caravans (also known as travel trailers and camper trailers), fifth-wheel trailers, popup campers, truck campers and Park Model RVs.

A large number of terms are used when describing aspects of recreational vehicle usage. Some of these are self-explanatory while others may be unfamiliar to many readers. Some terms, arranged alphabetically, are shown below.

Terms

References

External links 
 

Articles containing video clips
Camping
Recreational vehicles